The Vonnegut Hardware Company was a Indianapolis hardware store that operated from 1852 to 1965. It was founded by Clemens Vonnegut, Sr., a German former textile ribbon salesman from Amsterdam, who arrived in Indianapolis around 1851.

Indianapolis 
At the beginning of the 1800s, the land that would become known as Indianapolis was generally a densely forested wilderness.  Indiana was granted statehood in 1816 and four years later the Indiana General Assembly actively sought a site to re-establish a new State capital.  In 1821 the Indiana State Legislature had approved both the site and the name Indianapolis.  On January 1, 1825, the State capital was moved from Corydon (the territorial and first State capital), to Indianapolis. Indianapolis was incorporated in 1835.  By 1830, Indianapolis had grown to a town of approximately 1,000 people.  In 1850 the population of Indianapolis had grown to over 8,000 people.  It was then ranked as the 87th largest urban area in the United States.  Generally, Indianapolis area roads in 1850 were dirt, dusty in the summer and muddy in the winter and spring.  The surface of the National Road was cobblestone as it ran through the city.  Within the "mile square" known as Indianapolis, McAdamized road surfaces and wooden plank road surfaces diverged north and south of the great National Road. Indianapolis was just beginning to be seen as a chief railroad center by 1850.  Railroads facilitated trade and brought merchandise and settlers into the area.  By 1850 "mechanics of every handicraft" had found their way to Indianapolis and by 1855 the population of Indianapolis had doubled to 16,000 people.

The Vonnegut Hardware Company benefited from the rapid population growth of the City of Indianapolis.  In 1850, just two years before Vonnegut was founded, the City of Indianapolis had a population of 8,091.  By 1900 the population of Indianapolis had grown to 169,164 (ranked as the 21st largest urban area in the United States).  By 1960 Indianapolis had a population of 476,258.

Early hardware business in the 1800s 
In 1852 Clemens Vonnegut, Sr (1824–1906) entered into a partnership with fellow German Charles Volmer opening a hardware store in Indianapolis. Their merchandising store was called C Volmer & Vonnegut Hardware.

The original establishment was a one-room storefront at 71 West Washington Street or National Road as it was then called.  The site was directly opposite the Washington Hall.

Initially, C Volmer & Vonnegut Hardware would sell hardware, groceries, dry goods, coffin fittings, animal hides and leather, agricultural, carpentry, butcher and harness-making supplies.  Much of the merchandise was simply stacked outside on the wooden sidewalk for customers to browse and select.  Given many customers arrived only after making arduous journeys, the proprietors would make cheese, crackers and a cool mug of Madison ale available to customers.  The cheese, cracker and ale tradition continued from 1852 to approximately 1867.

There is some confusion regarding the business departure of Charles Volmer.  One accounting is that Volmer left to go out West and was never heard from again.  Another version of the story is that Volmer retired in 1857.  Clemens Vonnegut's son Franklin would later reflect that Volmer simply went across the street and opened a grocery and liquor business.  Perhaps a part of each story is correct.  It appears that Volmer and Vonnegut Sr dissolved their partnership in 1856. By 1857 the retail hardware store was renamed Clemens Vonnegut Hardware and Charles Volmer was no longer affiliated with the enterprise.  In 1858 Charles Volmer was operating a wholesale wine, liquor and cigar distributorship at 95 East Washington Street, Indianapolis.  By 1865 there is no longer a record of Charles Volmer in Indianapolis.

At about the same time the partnership was dissolved, Clemens Vonnegut moved his hardware store to 338 East Washington Street (between New Jersey and Alabama Streets).  He also moved his family into the apartment above the store.  Vonnegut Sr would not stay at this address very long.

Circa 1858 the business would move to 142 East Washington Street.  The family would also accompany this move taking-up residency in the apartment above the store.

In 1865 Clemens Vonnegut Hardware was operating out of a much larger building located at 178-180 East Washington Street.  The Vonnegut family would also reside above this storefront.

Clemens and his wife, Katharina (or Katherine) Blank Vonnegut (1828-1904) had four children, all boys. Three of their four sons were born in an apartment above their hardware store. The four children were Clemens Jr (1853-1921), Bernard (1855-1908), Franklin (1856-1952) and George (1860-1952).  Franklin often quipped that they probably took him downstairs to weigh him.

In 1866 the Vonnegut Sr family would move to a small home located at 508 East Market Street.  Later they would move to 504 East Market Street.  In 1897 Clemens and his wife Katharina would move to 1002 East Market.

Clemens Vonnegut Sr has been described as a sophisticated eccentric who often wore a cape and carried rocks in his walks around town to help strengthen his bicep muscles.  He also possessed a strong work ethic, was fair and honest with people and was an early Indianapolis visionary.

Many hard-working German farmers settled near Indianapolis.  Over time, a number came to look at Vonnegut Sr as their friend and trusted advisor.  Rather than trust a small, local bank, some would entrust their money to Vonnegut Sr for safekeeping and investment.  When the banks had grown stronger and larger and Vonnegut Sr considered them safe, he let it be known that he did not want to continue this depository service.  Reluctantly his friends then took their deposits to the bank.

Sometime around 1874 the business would move to 184-186 East Washington Street  This location was described as being a 22'x195' site upon which stood a three-floor building with basement.  The new location was in close proximity to the popular Little's Hotel (SE corner Washington and New Jersey Streets) which was then considered among of the finest hotels in the state.  Little's Hotel had a livery service and boasted of an omnibus system drawn by four high-stepping horses.  The omnibuses would take travelers between the hotels and the trains arriving and departing from the nearby Union Depot.

Close proximity to the Little's Hotel proved beneficial to Vonnegut.  By the mid-1800s, Indianapolis' strategic location was seen by many as being the Crossroads of America.  Covered Wagons full of ambitious pioneers heading west to seek their fortunes routinely clamored down the cobblestones of the National Road.  Many weary travelers stopped to overnight at the Little's Hotel.  Many visited Clemens Vonnegut Hardware to pick-up supplies.

Vonnegut Sr would purchase property at 342-348 East Washington Street and, so very briefly, move his business to that location in 1898.
     
In 1899 Vonnegut Sr would once again move his store, this time to 120-124 East Washington Street, selling his building at 342 East Washington to former US President Benjamin Harrison.  The new building located on the north side of Washington Street between Pennsylvania and Delaware Streets, had an area approximately 45' x 195' at its base.  It was a five-story building with a full basement.  Merchandising took place on multiple floors along with administrative offices and storage.  When, in 1925, Vonnegut purchased the Lilly Hardware Company (from James W Lilly who had, two years prior, purchased the interest of his business partner, Frank S Stalnaker) it also purchased Lilly's three-story building located at 114-118 East Washington Street.  As this location was directly west and adjacent to the Vonnegut store at 120-124 East Washington Street an archway was cut between the two buildings to merge them.

Even prior to 1900, Vonnegut Sr found it necessary to maintain a separate warehouse.  This facility was located at 746 South Delaware St, Indianapolis, IN (west side of Delaware St approximately 50' north of East McCarty Street).  The building on this site measured 36' x 150' at its base and was served by a railroad siding along the west end (originally served by the Pittsburgh, Cincinnati, Chicago and St Louis Railroad).

By 1892, sixty-eight-year-old Clemens Vonnegut Sr had ceded the day-to-day operation of his store to children Clemens Jr, Franklin, Bernard and George.  While not an official ownership document, the Indianapolis City Directories from 1892 through 1905 listed the four Vonnegut children as principals along with their father.  By 1899 the firm was no longer referring to itself as Clemens Vonnegut Hardware but rather as the Vonnegut Hardware Company.

Katharina Vonnegut died on April 12, 1904.  Clemens Vonnegut Sr died on December 13, 1906.  In 1908, after the passing of Clemens Sr, his four sons, Clemens Jr, Franklin, Bernard and George filed to incorporate the enterprise as The Vonnegut Hardware Company.

Hardware firm in the 1900s 

Clemens Jr, Franklin and George would work in the hardware store operations on and off for the better part of their lives. Bernard chose to follow a different path attending the Massachusetts Institute of Technology and the Polytechnic Institute of Hanover, Germany.  Bernard would become a noted architect (Vonnegut & Bohn Architects and later, Vonnegut, Bohn & Mueller Architects).  The popular author Kurt Vonnegut was Bernard's grandson.

In 1908 Franklin "Frank" Vonnegut (third son) took over as the company's president.  In one capacity or another, Franklin Vonnegut would continue to work in the business for the entirety of his life.  George Vonnegut would become the secretary and treasurer of the company.

Carl Prinzler, an Indianapolis native, was hired by Vonnegut in 1886 (aged 16 years). In 1895 Prinzler was named manager of the art-hardware and building material department.  By 1908 Prinzer, working in conjunction with his Indianapolis neighbor, architect Harry H Dupont, would develop and receive US patent protection for what would later come to be known in the industry as panic bar door hardware.  Under an arrangement involving the Vonnegut Hardware Company, Prinzler and Dupont, the patents would be assigned to Vonnegut for the manufacture, sale and distribution of what soon would be called the Von Duprin Safe Exit Device.  In its first year of production, 1908, Prinzler was selected to supervise the production and assembly of the device.  Prinzler was named a director of Vonnegut in 1910.  In all, Prinzler would proudly serve Vonnegut for over 50 years.  Prinzler died on May 30, 1949.

In 1906, Richard E Kremp was referred to The Vonnegut Hardware Co by Central (Indiana) Business College.  Vonnegut offered Kremp the position of stenographer and bookkeeper in the Accounts Payable Department.  Thus began his 54-year association with the company.  In 1922 Kremp was named office manager and in 1931 he was elected Treasurer and named to the board of directors. In 1932 he became general manager. In 1943 Kremp was elected President of the company and later Chairman of Board, positions he held until his retirement in February 1961.  Kremp proved to be a forward-looking executive.  He was a generous, approachable and respected man who led by example.  Richard E Kremp died on September 15, 1961.

Vonnegut Hardware Company retail stores were a popular and trusted shopping destination.  With the advancement of time, Vonnegut changed its inventory to meet the needs of a progressive society.  Vonnegut sold quality hardware, dry goods, hand and power tools, housewares, cutlery, and kitchen items, vacuum cleaners, sporting goods, radios, watches, gifts, toys, yard and garden tools/supplies, sportswear for men and women and much more. The downtown store also sold firearms, a full line of photography equipment, fireplace fixtures and other specialty items.  Through the Vonnegut catalog one could order from even a wider array of items.  Vonnegut customers developed the catch phrase "You Can Get It All At Vonnegut's" and the company often used that phrase in its advertising and promotions.

With the possible exception of The Great Depression years, Vonnegut was in a growth mode from 1887 through the mid-1960s.  When Carl Prinzler started his illustrious career at Vonnegut in 1886, he recalls a total work force of under twelve employees.  From time to time Vonnegut bought out other hardware stores in the Indianapolis market.  It purchased the Francke Hardware Company in 1910 (from Frederick Francke increasing the Vonnegut workforce by one-half to a total of 150 employees).  In 1925 Vonnegut Hardware purchased the Lilly Hardware Company (34 new Vonnegut employees).  Vonnegut purchased the Fountain Square Hardware Store from Alfred Obergfell in 1931.  The Fountain Square store, located at 1116 Prospect Street, continued to operate but under The Vonnegut Hardware Company name.  Alfred's son, Robert Obergfell, managed the store as an employee of Vonnegut.

Under Kremp's leadership, Vonnegut pioneered the concept of “neighborhood selling” by branching out from the downtown Indianapolis flagship store (120-124 E Washington St). In The Great Depression year of 1930, Vonnegut opened its first, full-line neighborhood shopping location in Irvington, approximately five and one half miles due east of the center of downtown Indianapolis.  Within a few years Vonnegut had 12 such neighborhood shopping stores within Marion County.  Over the years 1930 - 1965, The Vonnegut Hardware Company developed/operated at the following suburban store locations: 5609 E Washington St (Irvington); 3833 N Illinois St; 3416 E 38th St; 3228 E 10th St; 4221 College Ave; 2730 Madison Ave; 1116 Prospect St (Fountain Square);802 E 63rd St (Broad Ripple); 2802 Lafayette RD (Eagledale Shopping Center); 602 Twin Tire Dr (Twin Tire Shopping Center); 5910 Crawfordsville RD (Speedway Shopping Center); 8650 Pendleton Pike (Esquire Plaza Shopping Center); 6101 N Keystone Ave (Glendale Shopping Center); 532 E Pleasant Run Parkway, North Dr; 5331-33 W Washington St; Greenwood Shopping Center (Johnson County) and 13200 N Meridian St (Carmel - Hamilton County).

Within its downtown and neighborhood shopping stores, employees often conducted public do-it-yourself training on such topics as woodworking, plumbing, hobbies and home repair.  Oftentimes manufacturer representatives would conduct presentations in the Vonnegut stores showing Vonnegut customers how best to use their products.  Vonnegut Hardware Co was a regular exhibitor at trade and public shows such as the Indiana Retail Hardware Association convention, the Indianapolis Sports, Vacation and Boat Show and the Indianapolis Home Show.

Vonnegut was also a pioneer in offering customers various credit options such as 30-day accounts, charge plates, weekly or monthly payment terms and budget accounts.

In 1940 Vonnegut constructed a new multi-purpose building at 402 West Maryland Street (NW corner of Maryland and Missouri Streets), Indianapolis. Designed by the Indianapolis architectural firm of Vonnegut, Bohn and Mueller, this modern, six-story building contained 350,000 square feet and was built at an approximate cost of $500,000.  402 West Maryland was designed primarily for the mill supply and industrial supply divisions.  Mill supply, paint jobbing and other services would move from 120 East Washington Street to the Maryland Street building.  Some of the space in this large building was devoted to the manufacture and assembly of the Von Duprin Safe Exit Device.  Also this building served as a general warehouse and housed the commercial and industrial sale staffs. This was also the site of administrative offices, an auditorium and an employee cafeteria.  Vonnegut held to a standard of practice that commercial product orders (for in-stock inventory) received by 11 am would be fulfilled by 1 pm, same day.

By 1950, the Vonnegut mill supplies division covered all of Indiana and some of the adjoining territories in Ohio, Illinois, Michigan and Kentucky.

In early December 1952, the downtown store located at 120-124 E Washington Street suffered a 2-alarm fire during lunchtime hours.  The fire was mostly contained to the fifth floor which was used as a warehouse for the storage of toys.  At the height of the fire the water within the 50,000-gallon tank atop the building began to move and steam.  The insured loss was said to be $215,000.  No one was injured and the building was restored.

In 1957 Vonnegut moved its downtown store to a new location at 18-20 N Pennsylvania St, Indianapolis.

With stores located throughout Marion County, Vonnegut Hardware Co was largely known in Indianapolis for the efforts of its retail division.  While the retail division generally thrived after The Great Depression years, it provided only a small proportion of the firm's annual sales volume.  Vonnegut worked directly with a large number of high quality manufactures who allowed Vonnegut to distribute its products.  In turn, Vonnegut maintained a network of several hundred merchant dealers throughout Indiana. These independent retail hardware dealers sold Vonnegut supplied products to their local customers.  Thus, Vonnegut supplied products were finding their way into homes and businesses all over Indiana.  

Vonnegut also maintained the wholesale trade of tools and supplies to contractors directly engaged in the construction trades.  

The Vonnegut mill supply and industrial supply divisions marketed tools, hardware and supplies directly to commercial clientele and industrial firms within the region.  Among its larger industrial clients were: ALCOA (Lafayette and Richmond); RCA Victor (Indianapolis, Bloomington and Monticello); Overmyer Mold Company (Winchester); Lynch Corporation (Anderson); International Harvester (Indianapolis and Richmond) Cummins Engine and Arvin Industries (Columbus), Perfect Circle Corporation (Haggerstown and Richmond); Ball Brothers (Muncie); Allison Division of General Motors Corporation (Indianapolis); Union Carbide and Chemical Corporation (Kokomo); Guide Lamp and Delco Remy Divisions of General Motors Corporation (Anderson); Delco Radio and Delco Battery Divisions of General Motors Corporation (Kokomo and Muncie).

Through an extensive network of sales representatives, Vonnegut marketed the Von Duprin Safe Exit Device in every principal city in the United States.  Von Duprin Safe Exit Devices were originally manufactured, polished and assembled in Indianapolis; however, in order to facilitate high demand and distribution, additional manufacturing sites were chosen in North Chicago and Belleville, Ontario, Canada.  Vonnegut's far-reaching network of sales representatives caused the Von Duprin Safe Exit Device to be installed in schools, auditoriums, churches, libraries, government buildings, theaters and other public and private buildings throughout the United States and even in foreign countries. Among the many thousands buildings that would feature the Von Duprin Safe Exit Device were The United Nations Building, New York City, NY, the Statler Center and Hotel, Los Angeles, CA and the Severin Hotel, Indianapolis, IN.  Even prior to 1925, Von Duprin Safe Exit Devices were shipped to Japan, Australia and a few South American countries.

The Von Duprin Safe Exit Device has been credited for saving Vonnegut from financial ruin during The Great Depression.

Fred H. Johnson, a consultant to the wholesale hardware trade in Florida and a former executive officer with Marshall-Wells Company, Shapleigh Hardware Company, and the Lufkin Rule Company of Canada, served the company as its president and board member from 1961 to 1965.  Mr Johnson was a graduate of the University of Toronto.

Dedicated Vonnegut employees 
By the 1950s, Vonnegut employed in excess of three hundred people.  Vonnegut maintained a friendly, employee-centered corporate culture.  Employee activities were regularly planned.  The Vonnegut bowling league was especially popular.  Vonnegut had its own semi-professional band, led by employee Edwin E Kerner, who also played the viola, violin, and alto horn.

The employees presented clear and visible evidence that Vonnegut was a great place to work.  Many served their entire working careers at Vonnegut; long, happy and fulfilling years.  Fred W Hess, department manager wholesale and industrial supplies division served Vonnegut for 69 1/2 years (hired at 13 years of age).  Oscar Mueller, Frank Blank, William Klinhenz, Theodore Rugenstein, Ed Snyder, Al Brocking, Maurice Schultz, Homer A Eichacker, Carl Brocking, Albert Stich, Al Gruman, Clarence Childers, Carl J Prinzler, Edward J Galm Sr and Richard E Kremp were some the employees of Vonnegut whose service to the company exceeded 45 years.

Sale of hardware firm 
By early 1965 it became public that The Vonnegut Hardware Company and its Von Duprin division might be sold.  Very soon thereafter, with the involvement of the Boston investment banking firm of State Street Investments, Vonnegut Hardware Company was sold to the Schlage Lock Company, San Francisco. Circa 1965–1966, Schlage resold the retail components of Vonnegut to Indianapolis developer Warren Atkinson and a few Vonnegut Hardware Company employees.  The Schlage Lock Company retained all ownership interest in and to the industrial trade name Von Duprin and its products. Von Duprin continues to manufacture and distribute security-related products under its present-day holding company, Allegion.  Under Atkinson, et al., the retail division was renamed Vonnegut, Inc. and Edward J Galm, Jr became its president. A number of the retail stores were operated in the 1970s; however, by 1980, the hardware stores were all closed or sold and merged into other operating entities.

The Vonnegut Industrial Products division was also sold as part of the 1965 sale of the parent company.  The sale price for the Vonnegut Industrial Products division was reported to be $3 million.  The new owners, a group of former Vonnegut employees, incorporated under the name of Vonnegut Industrial Products, Inc. William H. Holbrook became the President of this firm and Everal Downing was named Vice President of Sales. This new entity expanded by purchasing a warehouse in Evansville, Indiana, to better serve southern Indiana and Kentucky.  Circa 1989, Vonnegut Industrial Products, Inc, with annual estimated sales of $40 million, was sold and merged into W W Grainger of Chicago, IL.

From its dusty beginnings in 1852, the family business would witness, and survive, the Civil War, the transition from the horse drawn buggy to the motor vehicle, World War I, The Great Depression, Prohibition, World War II, and many other life-altering times and events. In total, The Vonnegut Hardware Company operated under the Vonnegut family, and its dedicated employees, for 113 years (1852 to 1965). Prior to its sale in 1965, it was the longest standing retail merchant in the city of Indianapolis.

A "grand family" 
The Vonnegut family was a prominent family in Indianapolis.  Family members took lead roles in civic and Indianapolis business affairs.  Clemens Vonnegut Sr was a major proponent of quality education.  He served on the Indianapolis Board of Schools for 27 years.  Public School No. 9 at 407 Fulton Street, Indianapolis would later bear his name.  His son Franklin succeeded him on the Indianapolis Board of Schools and Theodore F. Vonnegut would also assume this role in the 1920s.  Clemens Vonnegut Sr and his sons Clemens Jr, Franklin and George were all gracious employers.  Each had a burning desire for fair treatment both to their employees and to the public.  The Vonneguts were a "grand family". All served various roles at The Vonnegut Hardware Company.  This same spirit continued on with the third and fourth generation of the Vonnegut family.

References

External links 
Images
Vonnegut Catalog, 1938
 Vonnegut Hardware Company images from the Indiana Historical Society: 1906, 1908, 1928, 1947, 1937, 1951, 1959, 1925, 1929

Retail companies established in 1852
Hardware stores of the United States
Defunct companies based in Indianapolis
Vonnegut family
1852 establishments in the United States